Kimberly is an unincorporated community in Grant County, Oregon, United States. It is located at the intersection of  Oregon Route 19 and Oregon Route 402 and the confluence of the John Day and the North Fork John Day rivers.

Kimberly was named after the prominent local Kimberly family. Orin Kimberly established the first commercial orchard in the area in the 1930s.

The James Cant Ranch Museum and the Thomas Condon Paleontology Center & Museum of the John Day Fossil Beds National Monument are located south of Kimberly on Route 19.

Climate
This region experiences warm (but not hot) and dry summers, with no average monthly temperatures above 71.6 °F.  According to the Köppen Climate Classification system, Kimberly has a warm-summer Mediterranean climate, abbreviated "Csb" on climate maps.

References

Unincorporated communities in Grant County, Oregon
Unincorporated communities in Oregon